Nordine Mouchi (born 3 June 1972) is a French boxer. He competed in the men's light welterweight event at the 1996 Summer Olympics.

References

1972 births
Living people
French male boxers
Olympic boxers of France
Boxers at the 1996 Summer Olympics
Sportspeople from Meurthe-et-Moselle
Light-welterweight boxers